Keith Lamar Johnson (May 17, 1972 – September 30, 2022), who went by the stage name Wonderboy, was an American gospel singer-songwriter.

In 1998, he started his solo music career with the release of Through the Storm, published by World Wide Gospel Records. He released fourteen albums, over the course of thirteen years, with World Wide Gospel Records, Worldwide Records, Verity Records, Central South Records, and Blacksmoke Records. Eleven albums charted on the Billboard magazine Gospel Albums chart with other chartings on the Independent Albums and Heatseekers Albums charts.

Early life
Johnson was born on May 17, 1972, in Brooklyn, New York, and he was given the moniker "Wonderboy" at the age of five because of his wondrous vocal acumen. He started singing with the Boys Choir of Harlem and his father Philip Johnson's quartet group the Spiritual Voices.

Music career
His music career started in 1998, with the release of Through the Storm by World Wide Gospel Records, and this would be just one of eleven albums to chart on the Billboard magazine charts, with most of the chartings occurring on the Gospel Albums. A few placements were on the Independent Albums chart, for 2000's Live and Alive, 2001's Tribute to Quartet Legends, Vol. 1, and 2002's Send a Revival, and those just happen to be the albums that placed on the Heatseekers Albums chart. The labels he has released albums with are World Wide Gospel, World Wide Records, Verity Records, Central South Records, and Blacksmoke Records, and he has released fourteen albums with those labels over the course of his thirteen-year career. His backing vocalist and band are called the Spiritual Voices.

Death
Johnson died on September 30, 2022, aged 50, after being found unresponsive at his home in Atlanta, Georgia.

Discography

References

External links

 
 

1972 births
2022 deaths
20th-century African-American people
21st-century African-American people
African-American Christians
African-American songwriters
American gospel singers
Musicians from Brooklyn
Songwriters from New York (state)
Urban contemporary gospel musicians